Highcharts is a software library for charting written in pure JavaScript, first released in 2009. The license is proprietary. It is free for personal/non-commercial uses and paid for commercial applications.

It was created by Highsoft in Vik, Norway and has been regularly featured in the national media, such as Finansavisen and Dagsrevyen.

History 
Torstein Hønsi is the main creator of the product. The product was first demonstrated and thought up in 2006. In an interview with Finansavisen, he spoke about need for a program for creating graphs and charts, allowing users to publish charts directly on a website.

Unlike many software products, it isn't developed at a well known tech location, such as Silicon Valley. The company is based in the small Norwegian town of Vik.

While the company is based in Norway, the product is used globally.  It was stated in an interview in 2014, that their customer base is primarily from abroad, with 97% of the company's revenue being generated from clients outside Norway. 
Highchart products featured on Norwegian television in late 2012, when the parent company featured on a national television show.  It was a segment in the middle of a 30-minute show, Dagsrevyen.

The Highcharts library is also notable in international industry media where it has been repeatedly referred to as one of the best JS charting libraries.

See also 
JavaScript framework
JavaScript library

References

External links 
 

Data visualization software
JavaScript libraries
JavaScript visualization toolkits
JavaScript
Proprietary software
Proprietary cross-platform software
Visualization API
Charts
Infographics